

Vitalie Zubac (born 1894, date of death unknown) was a Bessarabian politician. He was born in Necrasovca-Nouă.

Biography 

He served as Member of the Moldovan Parliament (1917–1918).

Gallery

Bibliography 
Gheorghe E. Cojocaru, Sfatul Țării: itinerar, Civitas, Chişinău, 1998, 
Mihai Taşcă, Sfatul Țării şi actualele autorităţi locale, "Timpul de dimineaţă", no. 114 (849), June 27, 2008 (page 16)

External links 
 http://astra.iasi.roedu.net/texte/nr36romaniidinbugeac.html
 http://ochiuldeveghe.over-blog.com/article-18159144.html
 https://web.archive.org/web/20110716135545/http://www.hasdeu.md/bibliopolis/index.php?bpa=1616
 Arhiva pentru Sfatul Tarii
 Deputaţii Sfatului Ţării şi Lavrenti Beria

Notes

1894 births
People from Odesa Oblast
Moldovan MPs 1917–1918
Year of death missing